Ahti Kalle Samuli Karjalainen (10 February 1923 – 7 September 1990) was a Finnish politician. He was a member of the Agrarian League (later known as Keskusta, Centre Party) and served two terms as Prime Minister of Finland. He is, however, better known for his period as Minister of Foreign Affairs of Finland. Karjalainen is considered one of the most influential figures in post-war Finnish politics. Like President Urho Kekkonen, Karjalainen attached great importance to Finland's relationship with the Soviet Union.

Karjalainen served as the Minister of the Treasury, Minister of Foreign Affairs and Minister of Trade and Industry for half a decade from 1957, forming his first government on 13 April 1962. It remained in office until December the following year; ultimately disbanding due to the resignations of ministers sympathetic to the SAK over economic and political issues. Karjalainen served a second term as prime minister from 15 July 1970 to 29 October 1971.

Karjalainen's ministerial career continued with only short interruptions until May 1977. By this time he had spent 5,772 days as a political minister - a period of service only surpassed by Johannes Virolainen. Karjalainen first entered the Parliament of Finland in 1966, serving as a member for 13 years.

In 1950, Urho Kekkonen made Karjalainen a key secretary in his first government. This was the start of a long-standing cooperative relationship between Kekkonen and Karjalainen, which endured for more than twenty years. So close was their partnership that throughout the 1960s and early 1970s, Karjalainen was seen by many as Kekkonen's crown prince and a possible successor. Their partnership ended when Kekkonen dismissed Karjalainen's second government in 1971.

In 1981 Karjalainen put his name forward to be presidential candidate of the Centre Party, but lost to Johannes Virolainen. The election was ultimately won by Mauno Koivisto who became President of Finland in January 1982, succeeding Kekkonen.

Outside politics Karjalainen had a successful career with the Bank of Finland. He served as director of its research facility from 1953 to 1957, and was elected to its Board of Management in 1958. Karjalainen served as Deputy Governor of the Bank of Finland from 1979, acting chairman of the board from 1979 to 1982 and as governor from 1982 to 1983.

Karjalainen was a Doctor of Political Science; his thesis was entitled "The relationships between the monetary politics of the Bank of Finland and the state economy from 1811 to 1953 mainly regarding liquidity analysis".

The later stages of Karjalainen's political career were notably affected by his alcoholism – a national scandal ensued following his final resignation as prime minister when he was arrested for drunk-driving. His alcoholism was the cause of his dismissal as Governor of the Bank of Finland in 1983. Karjalainen's use of alcoholic beverages and the peculiar manner in which he spoke the English language led him to receive the moniker of "Tankero". "Tankero jokes" ended up becoming a widely known part of Finnish culture.

In 1986, Karjalainen was offered honorary membership of the Centre Party, but refused to accept the title on the basis of the treatment he had previously received.

In 1989, Karjalainen, with the assistance of Jukka Tarkka (fi), publicised his memoirs where he publicly claimed that Paavo Väyrynen had worked with the support of the Soviet Union – naming in particular Ministerial Adviser and KGB spy Viktor Vladimirov – to improve Karjalainen's chances in the 1982 presidential elections. This led to a request for clarification to the Parliamentary Constitutional Affairs Committee, led by Kimmo Sasi, a Member of Parliament, to examine the legality of Väyrynen's activities. However, the Constitutional Affairs Committee did not consider Väyrynen to have violated the Ministerial Accountability Act and the matter therefore lapsed.

Karjalainen died of pancreatic cancer at the Riistavuori retirement home in Helsinki on 7 September 1990. He is buried in Hietaniemi Cemetery.

Cabinets
 Karjalainen I Cabinet
 Karjalainen II Cabinet

References

External links
 Ahti Karjalainen in the minister database of the state council
 Biography of Karjalainen on Hirvensalmi's pages
 Ahti Karjalainen in the YLE national sound clip gallery

1923 births
1990 deaths
People from Hirvensalmi
Centre Party (Finland) politicians
Prime Ministers of Finland
Deputy Prime Ministers of Finland
Ministers of Trade and Industry of Finland
Ministers for Foreign Affairs of Finland
Members of the Parliament of Finland (1966–70)
Members of the Parliament of Finland (1970–72)
Members of the Parliament of Finland (1972–75)
Members of the Parliament of Finland (1975–79)
Governors of the Bank of Finland
Finnish military personnel of World War II
Deaths from cancer in Finland
Deaths from pancreatic cancer
Grand Crosses of the Order of the White Lion